Makaela Tuhakaraina (born 23 August 2003) is an Australian rules footballer playing for the Fremantle Football Club in the AFL Women's (AFLW).

Tuhakaraina was drafted by Fremantle with their fourth selection, and 38th overall in the 2021 AFL Women's draft. A former junior rugby league player, she switched to playing Australian rules football in 2020 when COVID-19 related led to the women's rugby league season being cancelled due to a lack of teams.

Tuhakaraina made her debut in the opening round of the 2022 AFL Women's season, playing as a small forward.

References

External links 

WAFL playing statistics

2003 births
Living people
Fremantle Football Club (AFLW) players
Australian rules footballers from Western Australia